Jambudweep is a Digambara Jain temple in Hastinapur, Uttar Pradesh built under the blessings of Gyanmati Mataji in 1972. Jambudweep is a depiction of Jain cosmology Jambudvipa.

About

Jambudweep was founded by Gyanmati Mataji in 1972 and the model of Jambudvipa was completed in 1985. For the tirtha, Nalini Balbir reported 

Jambudweep depicts the model Jain cosmology has been designed here under the supervision of Shri Gyanmati Mataji was in 1985.

The fundamental idea behind this temple is to connect devotional temple visit with religious adventure and educate devotees about the Jain cosmology. The official name of the tirtha is the Digambar Jain Institute of Cosmographic Research (Digambar Jain Trilok Shodh Sansthan) and its main attraction is the building constructed as a model of Jambudvipa.

Story
In the story about Jambudweep, Gyanmati Mataji had a vision in 1965 while meditating. In the vision, she saw the entire structure of universe. Discovering later that what she had seen perfectly matched the cosmographical details described in Jain scriptures, she decided to create a pilgrimage site with the aim of creating a model of Jambudvipa. "Jambudweep Trilok Sodh Sansthan" has been established at Jambudweep, Hastinapur to raise awareness regarding the Jain Cosmology and Jain Philosophy. Jambudweep developed a website http://www.jambudweep.org in 2007 to spread the Jain philosophy online, with more than 2000 books uploaded.

Main temples 

The premises has various Jain temples which includes Sumeru Parvat, Lotus Temple, Teen Murti Mandir, Meditation Temple, Badi Murti, Teen Lok Rachna and many other tourist attractions. The main temples in the Jambudweep complex includes:

 Teen Lok Rachna is modeled after trilok in Jain cosmology, the temple has a series of floor representing seven Adho Loka — the realms of the hellish beings, then Madhya Loka – the realms of the humans, animals and plants, then seven Urdhva Loka – the realms of the gods or heavens and Siddhashila at the top. The temple features a light and sound show similar to ones in Akshardham and ISKCON Temple, Delhi.
 Sahastrakut Jinalya is notable for a panel depicting Jain monk in worship room praying to tirthankara. The panel was discovered buried where Sahastrakut Jinalya constructed.
 Lotus temple a small temple in the courtyard of Jambudweep. It is a Jain House of Worship and also a prominent attraction in Hastinapur. It was completed in 1989.
 Mt. Meru, surrounded by water, is the tallest structure in Jambudweep complex. The mountain has concentric circle with small shrines representing the holy mountain peaks.
 Tera-dvipa is modeled after group of thirteen islands of the middle section of the universe in Jain cosmology. The structure features fived Mt. Meru, three islands where human and Jinas are born, the Jambudweep is situated in innermost circle and eight islands depicts nandishvar dweepa. The eight islands of nandishvar dweepa are connected to ashtanika, the eight day festival.

Gallery

See also
Hastinapur
Prachin Bada Mandir
Kailash Parvat Rachna
Shree Ashtapad Teerth

References

Citations

Sources

External links
 Official Website
 

Jain temples in Uttar Pradesh
Tourist attractions in Meerut district
20th-century Jain temples